Bangabandhu Cup is an International Kabaddi tournament held in Bangladesh. It's named after Bangladesh's father of the nation Bangabandhu Sheikh Mujibur Rahman. The first edition took place in 2021.

History
The edition took place in 2021 with Bangladesh, Nepal, Sri Lanka, Kenya, Poland. Bangladesh won the cup and Kenya became the runner's up.

The second edition took place in 2022. Three new teams participated which are Iraq, England and Malaysia. Poland didn't participate because of Ukraine war.

Summary

Tournament Summary

References

Kabaddi
Kabaddi in Bangladesh
Kabaddi competitions